Kellerhals is a surname. Notable people with the surname include: 

Erich Kellerhals (1939–2017), German billionaire businessman
Ruth Kellerhals (born 1957), Swiss mathematician